The MF 88 is a steel-wheel variant of electric multiple units used on Paris's Métro system. RATP contracted a consortium of manufacturers, with Ateliers du Nord de la France (now Bombardier Transportation) in charge of the project. They were built following successful tests of a prototype train-set called the "BOA", derived from the MF 77, which tested new features such as interconnecting passages between cars to improve passenger distribution and special bogies to reduce friction caused by the sharp curves found in the Métro network.

Carrying on the features of the BOA, a total of nine MF 88 train-sets were built, which currently operate on Line 7bis in a three-car formation. The high rate of wear-and-tear of the train-sets has made maintenance much more expensive than expected. This is because of the design flaw in the chassis, it has one axle which is very unusual. It was speculated that they were likely to be replaced by spare MF 67s, which in turn were replaced by the MF 2000. However, this plan has been abandoned and it is unclear if the trains will be considered for a mid-life refurbishment (from :fr:MF 88).

Technical specifications
 Manufacturers: Alstom, Faiveley, Renault, ANF
 Electric source: 750 V DC third rail
 Traction: GTO (Gate Turn Off)
 Maximum speed: 
 Bogies: Bi-Directional
 Length: 
 Train-set: M-B-M

Formations 
In date of 01September 2022:

8 Mf88 trainsets were in service and were formed as shown below,
One trainset was scrapped in 2013 

As of 1 March 2022, 8 trainsets were allocated to Pré St gervais Depot (Paris) for use on Line 7Bis, in a 3-car formation (2M1T).

MF 1988

Paris Métro line 7bis
750 V DC multiple units
Alstom multiple units
Electric multiple units of France